Galugah (also Romanized as Galūgāh) is a city & capital of Bandpey-ye Sharqi District, Babol County, Mazandaran Province, Iran.  At the 2006 census, its population was 2,512, in 644 families.

References

Populated places in Babol County
Cities in Mazandaran Province